Madathukulam is a state assembly constituency in Tamil Nadu, India newly formed after constituency delimitations 2008. Its State Assembly Constituency number is 126. It is included in the Tiruppur parliamentary constituency. It is one of the 234 State Legislative Assembly Constituencies in Tamil Nadu in India.

It covers the area of Madathukulam.

Election Results

2021

2016

2011

References 

Assembly constituencies of Tamil Nadu